NAF Veibok is a triannual publication issued by the Norwegian Automobile Federation. The book contains road maps, route descriptions and other road information. The first edition of the book came in 1928. The 29th edition, published in 2010, contains a total of about 800 pages, including an atlas of 136 map pages of a scale of 1:400,000, covering the Norwegian mainland.

References

Norwegian books
Travel guide books
Publications established in 1928
1928 establishments in Norway
Maps of Norway
Atlases